This article is the Electoral history of William Lyon Mackenzie King, the tenth Prime Minister of Canada. A Liberal, he was Canada's longest-serving Prime Minister, with three separate terms as Prime Minister (1921–1926, 1926–1930 and 1935–1948), for a total of 21 years and 154 days.  He defeated Prime Ministers Arthur Meighen and R.B. Bennett at different times, and was succeeded by Prime Minister Louis St. Laurent in 1948.

King was elected to the House of Commons of Canada twelve times (1908, 1909, 1919, 1921, 1922, 1926 (twice), 1930, 1935, 1940, and 1945).

He was elected leader of the Liberal Party of Canada in 1919, by the first leadership convention for a federal party in Canada.

Summary 

King was the longest-serving Prime Minister, in office for a total of 21 years, 154 days.  He led the Liberal Party of Canada in seven consecutive general elections, winning six times (1921, 1925, 1926, 1935, 1940, 1945) and losing once (1930).  He won minority governments three times (1925, 1926 1945) and majority governments three times (1921, 1935, and 1940). He is in a three-way tie with Sir John A. Macdonald and Sir Wilfrid Laurier for the number of general elections he contested as leader of a party.

His unbroken term in office from October 23, 1935 to November 14, 1948 (just over thirteen years) is the second-longest unbroken term, coming after Laurier's unbroken term in office of over fifteen years (July 11, 1896 to October 6, 1911) and just ahead of Macdonald's longest unbroken term of just under thirteen years (October 17, 1878 to June 6, 1891).

King was the third of four prime ministers to serve non-consecutive terms, the others being Macdonald, Meighen, and Pierre Trudeau.

King was the fourth of five prime ministers from Ontario, the others being Sir John A. Macdonald, Alexander Mackenzie, Sir Mackenzie Bowell, and Lester Pearson.

King stood for election to the House of Commons of Canada sixteen times, in ten general elections and six by-elections. He was elected twelve times and defeated four times. Three of the by-elections were ministerial by-elections, triggered by King entering the federal Cabinet, once as Minister of Labour (1909) and twice as Prime Minister (1922, 1926).  Two of the by-elections were in response to his defeats in his own constituency in general elections, which compelled him to seek election to a safe seat to re-enter the Commons.  One by-election was after his election as leader of the Liberal Party, where he stood for election in a vacant seat to enter the House of Commons as quickly as possible.

King was a member of the House of Commons for five different constituencies, from three different provinces (Ontario, Prince Edward Island and Saskatchewan), a more diverse electoral record than any other Prime Minister.  He served in the House of Commons for a total of 32 years and 7 days.

Federal general elections, 1921 to 1945
King led the Liberal Party in seven general elections, winning six (three majority governments and three minority governments) and was defeated once.

Canadian federal election, 1921

The 1921 election resulted in the a razor-thin majority government for King.  King was able to maintain his government for four years, with the support of the Progressives in the Commons.

1 Leader of the Opposition when election was called;  Prime Minister after the election.
2 Prime Minister when election was called;  Leader of the Opposition after the election.
3 Table does not include parties which received votes but did not elect any members.

Canadian federal election, 1925 

Although Arthur Meighen and the Liberal-Conservatives won more seats than King and the Liberals, King was able to form a minority government with the support of the Progressives.  King was also defeated in his own seat of York North, Ontario and had to seek election in a safe seat, Prince Albert, Saskatchewan. However, he was forced to resign over a federal procurement scandal less than a year into office, leading to his replacement as Prime Minister by Arthur Meighen, leader of the Liberal-Conservatives.  These events triggered a constitutional crisis, the King–Byng Affair, and the general election of 1926.

1 Leader of the Opposition when election was called;  Leader of the Opposition after the election.
2 Prime Minister when election was called;  Prime Minister after the election.
3 Less than 0.05% of the popular vote. 
4 Table does not include parties which received votes but did not elect any members.

Canadian federal election, 1926 

This general election was called on the advice of Prime Minister Meighen, appointed Prime Minister by the Governor-General, Viscount Byng, after King resigned as Prime Minister.  King's resignation triggered a constitutional crisis, the King-Byng Affair.  King and the Liberals won the greatest number of seats in the election, but were short of a majority.  King formed a minority government with support from some Progressives, particularly the Liberal-Progressives.  His minority government lasted for four years.

1 Leader of the Opposition when election was called;  Prime Minister after the election.
2 Prime Minister when election was called;  Leader of the Opposition after the election.
3 Less than 0.05% of the popular vote. 
3 Table does not include parties which received votes but did not elect any members.

Canadian federal election, 1930 

The 1930 election was King's only election loss at the national level.  The Liberal-Conservatives formed a majority government, with R.B. Bennett as Prime Minister.  King remained as leader of the Liberal Party and became Leader of the Opposition.

1 Leader of the Opposition when election was called;  Prime Minister after election.
2 Prime Minister when election was called;  Leader of the Opposition after the election.
3 Less than 0.5% of the popular vote.
4 Table does not include parties which received votes but did not elect any members.

1935 Canadian federal election

In the 1935 election, King and the Liberals decisively defeated the Liberal-Conservatives, giving King his first outright majority government.

1 Leader of the Opposition when election was called;  Prime Minister after election.
2 Prime Minister when election was called;  Leader of the Opposition after the election.
3 Less than 0.04% of national vote.
4 Table does not include parties which received votes but did not elect any members.

1940 Canadian federal election 

In the 1940 election, King and the Liberals were re-elected, with another majority government.

1 Prime Minister when election was called;  Prime Minister after election.
2 Leader of the Opposition when election was called;  Leader of the Opposition after the election.
3 Table does not include parties which received votes but did not elect any members.

1945 Canadian federal election 

In the 1945 election, King and the Liberals were re-elected, but with another minority government. King managed to stay in power by a working alliance with a group of Independent Liberals, who had opposed his position on conscription.  King was defeated in his own seat of Prince Albert, Saskatchewan, and had to seek election in another safe seat, Glengarry, Ontario.

1 Prime Minister when election was called;  Prime Minister after election.
2 Leader of the Opposition when election was called;  Leader of the Opposition after the election.
3 Table does not include parties which received votes but did not elect any members.

Federal constituency elections, 1908 to 1945
King stood for election to the House of Commons sixteen times, in three different provinces (Ontario, Prince Edward Island and Saskatchewan).

1908 Federal Election:  Waterloo North

1909 Federal Ministerial By-Election:  Waterloo North
At this time, newly appointed Cabinet ministers had to stand for re-election, but it was customary for the other political party not to oppose the election.

1911 Federal Election:  Waterloo North
This was the first of King's four defeats at the constituency level.

1917 Federal Election:  York North
This was the second of King's four defeats at the constituency level.

1919 Federal By-Election:  Prince
This by-election was triggered by the death of the incumbent, Joseph Read.  King had recently been elected leader of the Liberal Party, and stood for election in Prince Edward Island to obtain a seat in the Commons as quickly as possible.

1921 Federal Election:  York North

1922 Federal Ministerial By-Election:  York North
At this time, newly appointed Cabinet ministers, including a new Prime Minister, had to stand for re-election, but it was customary for the other political party not to oppose the election.

1925 Federal Election:  York North
This was the third of King's four defeats at the constituency level.

1926 Federal By-Election:  Prince Albert
The incumbent, Charles McDonald, who had just won the Prince Albert seat in the 1925 general election, was persuaded to resign to allow King to stand for election and re-enter the House of Commons.  Although the custom at the time was that the other parties would not contest a by-election to allow a party leader to obtain a seat, the defeated Conservative candidate from the general election, future Prime Minister John Diefenbaker, encouraged David Burgess to contest the seat as an independent.

1926 Federal Election:  Prince Albert

This is the only case where two future Prime Ministers faced each other as candidates for the same riding.

1926 Federal Ministerial By-Election:  Prince Albert
Due to a federal procurement scandal, King had resigned as Prime Minister in mid-1926 and been replaced by Arthur Meighen, who shortly afterwards called the 1926 general election. Having won the general election and been appointed Prime Minister, King was required to stand for re-election, but it was customary for the other political party not to oppose the election.

1930 Federal Election:  Prince Albert

1935 Federal Election:  Prince Albert

1940 Federal Election:  Prince Albert

1945 Federal Election:  Prince Albert
This was the fourth of King's four defeats at the constituency level.

1945 Federal By-Election: Glengarry
In the 1945 general election, William MacDiarmid won the seat for the Liberals.  He resigned the seat to allow King an opportunity to re-enter the House of Commons.

Liberal Party leadership convention, 1919 

King won the leadership after three completed ballots.  His primary opposition was William Stevens Fielding, former premier of Nova Scotia and former Finance Minister in Laurier's governments.

1 Rounding error.

See also 
 Electoral history of Wilfrid Laurier - King's predecessor as leader of the Liberal party.
 Electoral history of Arthur Meighen - King's first predecessor as Prime Minister and opponent in three general elections.
 Electoral history of R. B. Bennett - King's second predecessor as Prime Minister and opponent in two general elections.
 Electoral history of Louis St. Laurent - King's successor as leader of the Liberal party and as Prime Minister.

References

External links 

 History of Federal Ridings since 1867
 Library of Parliament – Liberal Leadership Convention, 1919

King, William Lyon Mackenzie